Johnston Press plc was a multimedia company founded in Falkirk, Scotland, in 1767. Its flagship titles included UK-national newspaper the i, The Scotsman, the Yorkshire Post, the Falkirk Herald, and Belfast's The News Letter. The company was operating around 200 newspapers and associated websites around the United Kingdom and the Isle of Man when it went into administration and was the purchased by JPIMedia in 2018. The Falkirk Herald was the company's first acquisition in 1846. Johnston Press's assets were transferred to JPIMedia in 2018, who continued to publish its titles.

Johnston Press announced it would place itself in administration on 16 November 2018 after it was unable to find a suitable buyer of the business to refinance £220m of debt. It was delisted from the London Stock Exchange on 19 November 2018. Johnston Press and its assets were brought under the control of JPIMedia on 17 November 2018 after a pre-packaged deal was agreed with creditors.

History

The Johnston family business was involved in printing from 1797, originally in Falkirk. It bought control of its first newspaper, the Falkirk Herald, in 1846. The company would remain headquartered in Falkirk for the next 150 years. The family publishing company was renamed F Johnston & Co Ltd in 1882, a title it would retain until it was floated on the London Stock Exchange as Johnston Press in 1988.

The company's first major acquisition came in 1970, when it took control of the Fife-based publishers Strachan & Livingston. In 1978, it bought Wilfred Edmunds Ltd in Chesterfield, publisher of the Derbyshire Times and The Yorkshire Weekly Newspaper Group in Wakefield. The company bought The West Sussex County Times in 1988, The Halifax Evening Courier in 1994 and the newspaper interests of EMAP plc in 1996. Further expansion followed with Portsmouth & Sunderland Newspapers in 1999 and Regional Independent Media Holdings in 2002.

The company expanded into the Irish market in 2005 by purchasing Local Press Ltd, a company owned by 3i (£65 million), the newspaper assets of Scottish Radio Holdings, known as Score Press with forty-five titles in Scotland and Ireland (£155 million), and the Leinster Leader Group (€138.6 million).

Johnston Press acquired The Scotsman Publications in 2006, taking ownership of two of Scotland's major national broadsheet titles, The Scotsman and Scotland on Sunday, as well as two local papers, the Edinburgh Evening News and the Edinburgh Herald & Post.

In 2014, Iconic Newspapers acquired Johnston Press' titles in the Republic of Ireland. In March of that year, Johnston Press launched a digital advertising agency called 1XL, in partnership with a number of other media companies including Local World and Newsquest.

In February 2016, the company announced it was buying i newspaper for £24m. The deal to buy i was completed on 10 April 2016, giving Johnston Press a daily print circulation of over 600,000 newspapers and an audience online and in print of almost 32 million people. In July 2016 Johnston Press sold off its three titles on the Isle of Man — the Isle of Man Examiner, the Isle of Man Courier and the Manx Independent — to Tindle Newspapers in a deal worth £4.25m. In January 2017 Johnston sold off a further 13 titles covering the East Midlands and East Anglia (including the Stamford Mercury) to Iliffe Media for £17m. The same month, the company also won a contract from Associated Newspapers (ANL) to print the Monday-to-Saturday issues of the Daily Mail newspaper at Johnston's Portsmouth Web facility in Hampshire, following the closure of ANL's printing site at Didcot.

Administration
In October 2018, with debts of around £200m and a market capitalisation of £3m, the company announced that it had put itself up for sale. On 16 November 2018, the group announced it was filing for administration, intending to then sell the assets to its lenders. Johnson Press in a statement added there was no longer any value in its shares, in a major blow to Christen Ager-Hanssen, the chief executive of Custos Group, which was the largest shareholder at 25 percent. The company agreed a pre-packaged administration whereby Johnston Press's businesses and assets would be sold to a group of companies controlled by its creditors. Those included GoldenTree Asset Management, the largest creditor with about £70m of bonds.

Takeover by creditors
On 17 November 2018, a spokesperson for Johnston Press announced that all its titles had been transferred to the control of JPIMedia, a special purpose vehicle (SPV), owned by the creditors. Under the terms of the pre-packaged deal, ownership passed to a consortium of four lenders, CarVal, Fidelity, Benefit Street Partners and Goldentree Asset Management – who reduced its debts to £85 million and injected £35 million investment. This however was subject to criticism by Johnston Press's largest shareholder, described as a "blatant pre-planned corporate theft by bondholders", and was raised in Parliament.

Operations

Newspapers in Great Britain
The following is a partial list of British newspapers once owned by the company:

Arbroath Herald
Banbury Guardian
Batley & Birstall News
Bellshill Speaker
Berwick Advertiser
Biggleswade Chronicle
Blackpool Gazette
Bognor Regis Observer
Bridlington Free Press
Brighton & Hove Independent
Buckingham Advertiser
Bucks Herald
Burnley Express
Buxton Advertiser
Carrick Gazette
Chichester Observer
Chorley Guardian
Crawley Observer
Cumbernauld News
Daventry Express
Dewsbury Reporter
Diss Express
Dinnington Guardian
Doncaster Free Press
Edinburgh Evening News
Edinburgh Herald and Post
Eastbourne Herald
East Grinstead Gazette
Ellon Times
Falkirk Herald
Fife Free Press
Fife Herald & Post
Fife Leader
Filey Mercury
Fleetwood Weekly News
Galloway Gazette
Gainsborough Standard
Glasgow South and Eastwood Extra
Green Un (Sheffield)
Halifax Courier
Harborough Mail
Hartlepool Mail
Harrogate Advertiser
Hemel Hempstead Gazette
Hemsworth and South Elmsall Express
Horncastle News
The i
Kilsyth Chronicle
Lanark Gazette
Lancashire Evening Post
Lancaster Guardian
Lancaster Visitor
Lancing Herald
Leyland Guardian
Leamington Courier
Leighton Buzzard Observer
Littlehampton Gazette
Louth Leader
Luton News
Lynn News
Lytham St Annes Express
Market Rasen Mail
Malton & Pickering Mercury
Mansfield Chad
Mid Sussex Times
Mirfield Reporter
Milngavie and Bearsden Herald
Milton Keynes Citizen
Montrose Review
Morecambe Visitor
Morpeth Herald
Motherwell Times
News Guardian
News Post Leader
The News (Portsmouth)
Northamptonshire Evening Telegraph
Northampton Chronicle & Echo
Northumberland Gazette
Paisley and Renfrewshire Extra (now defunct)
Perth Herald & Post
Peterborough Evening Telegraph
Pocklington Post
Retford Guardian
Ripon Gazette
Rugby Advertiser
Scarborough News
Scotland on Sunday
The Scotsman
Selby Times
Sheffield Star
Sheffield Telegraph
Shields Gazette
Shoreham Herald
Skegness Standard
Spilsby Standard
Stornoway Gazette
Sunderland Echo
Sussex Express
Times & Citizen (Bedford)
Todmorden News
 The Visitor (Morecambe, Lancs)
Westend Extra (Glasgow)
West Lothian Herald & Post
West Sussex County Times
West Sussex Gazette
   West Sussex Citizen
Wetherby News
Whitby Gazette
Wigan Post
Worksop Guardian
Worthing Herald
Yorkshire Evening Post
Yorkshire Post

Newspapers in Ireland
JPIMedia publishes a total of 22 titles in Northern Ireland through two holding companies, JPIMedia NI and Derry Journal Newspapers. The geographic readership of some titles extends across the Irish border into the Republic of Ireland, such as the  Derry Journal which also covers County Donegal. Former JPIMedia titles published in the Republic of Ireland now belong to Iconic Newspapers.

Johnston Publishing (NI)

Daily
 The News Letter

Local (NI)
 Ballymena Times
 Ballymoney and Moyle Times
 Carrick Times (Carrickfergus)
 Coleraine Times
 Dromore Leader
 Larne Times
 Londonderry Sentinel
 Lurgan Mail
 Mid Ulster Mail
 Portadown Times
 Newtownabbey Times
 Tyrone Times
 Ulster Star

Free titles (NI)
 Banbridge & District Weekender
 Belfast News
 Craigavon Echo
 East Antrim Advertiser
 Lisburn Echo
 Mid Ulster Echo
 North West Echo

Derry Journal newspapers

Local (Derry Journal)
 Derry Journal
 Sunday Journal

Free titles (Derry Journal)
 City News
 Foyle News

References

External links
 

 
1767 establishments in Scotland
2018 disestablishments in Scotland
Companies established in 1767
Companies based in Edinburgh
Companies based in Falkirk (council area)
Companies formerly listed on the London Stock Exchange
Companies that have entered administration in the United Kingdom
Magazine publishing companies of the United Kingdom
Newspaper companies of Scotland
Newspaper companies of the United Kingdom
Publishing companies established in the 1760s
Publishing companies disestablished in 2018